William Doolin was an American politician. As a Unionist, he was elected member of the Nevada Assembly on November 4, 1868 and together with John Bowman he represented Nye County in the lower house. Doolin's term started the following day and he served in one regular session. His term ended after the next election, at which A. H. Greenhalgh and John Bowman were elected representatives of Nye County in the Assembly.

References 

Nevada Unionists
Members of the Nevada Assembly
People from Nye County, Nevada
19th-century American politicians